Apurba Kishore Bir (born 1948), also known as A. K. Bir, is an Indian film cinematographer, screenwriter and director. An alumnus of the Film and Television Institute of India, Pune, he worked in various Ad-films and documentaries before making his feature-film debut. He won the National Film Award for Best Cinematography for 27 Down, his debut film. His directional debut Aadi Mimansa won the Nargis Dutt Award for Best Feature Film on National Integration. Bir's other directional ventures Lavanya Preeti and Baaja were bestowed with the National Film Award for Best Children's Film. As of 2014, he has won nine National Film Awards—including three for Best Cinematography—and is one of the directors of National Film Development Corporation of India.

Biography
Born in Balikuti village of Odisha, Bir had a great passion for painting. At the insistence of his father, he joined the Film and Television Institute of India with a specialisation in motion-picture cinematography. After passing out of the institute, he worked on short films and documentaries. 27 Down, his debut feature-film as a cinematographer, won him the Best Cinematographer award at the 21st National Film Awards. Nearly 70 percent of the film was shot using a handheld camera. Bir was one of the first-unit cameramen for Richard Attenborough's Gandhi. He won two more awards for "Best Cinematography" for Daasi (1988) and Aadi Mimansa (1991). The latter also marked his directional debut. It won the Nargis Dutt Award for Best Feature Film on National Integration. As a director Known for his work in Parallel Cinema. Bir's films focused on children as two of his films—Lavanya Preeti and Baaja won the National Film Award for Best Children's Film in 1993 and 2002 respectively. The former received the "Best Asian Film" award at the Osaka International Film Festival in addition to an "International Jury's Critic Award" and a screening at the Berlin International Film Festival. Hamari Beti, for which he wrote the screenplay apart from photography and direction, was screened at the competitive section of the "World Film Section" of Chicago International Film Festival in 2006. In 2012, Bir was appointed as one of the directors of the National Film Development Corporation of India. He headed the "Technical Sub-committee" and was the chairman of the feature film jury of the 45th International Film Festival of India in 2014.

Filmography

 27 Down (1973)
 Gharonda (1977)
 Godhuli (1977)
 Ondanondu Kaladalli (1978)
 Khatta Meetha (1978)
 Prem Vivah (1979)
 Dooriyaan (1979)
 Hamari Bahu Alka (1982)
 Gandhi (1982; was a part of the first-unit cameramen)
 Rangula Kala (1983)
 Aadat Se Majboor (1983) (screenwriter)
 Tum Laut Aao (1983)
 Maa Ooru (1983; documentary film)
 Ram Avtar (1988)
 Daasi (1988)
 Pestonjee (1988)
 Matti Manushulu (1990)
 Aadi Mimansa (1991, also director)
 Diksha (1991)
 Lavanya Preeti (1991, also screenwriter and director)
 Aranyaka (1994) (also screenwriter and director)
 Shesha Drushti (1997, also director)
 Nandan (1998, also director)
 Baaja (2002, also screenwriter and director)
 Shararat (2002)
 Hari Villu (2003)
 Sikhar (2005)
 Hamari Beti (also screenwriter and director)
 Jianta Bhuta (2008)
 Huppa Huiyya (2010)

Awards

National Film Awards

Best Cinematography
 1973: 27 Down
 1988: Daasi
 1991: Aadi Mimansa

Best Regional Film (Oriya)
 1997: Shesha Drushti
 1998: Nandan

Best Children's films
 1991: Lavanya Preeti
 2002: Baaja

Best Film on National Integration
1991: Aadi Mimansa

Other awards and honours
 1991 – Aravindan Award for Best First Film of a Director Aadi Mimansa
 1993 – International Jury's Critic Award at Udaipur International Film Festival for Lavanya Preeti
 Jayadeba Award
 Lavanya Preeti – Best Asian Film award at the Osaka International Film Festival.
 2011 – Taranga Cine Awards for Best Cinematography
 2013 – Padma Shri

References

External links
 
 Apurba Kishore Bir on 27 Down
 AK Bir at CFS India

1948 births
Living people
Hindi film cinematographers
Indian male screenwriters
Screenwriters from Odisha
Odia film directors
Hindi-language film directors
Best Cinematography National Film Award winners
Recipients of the Padma Shri in arts
20th-century Indian film directors
Film and Television Institute of India alumni
Odia screenwriters
Cinematographers from Odisha
Directors who won the Best Children's Film National Film Award
Producers who won the Best Film on National Integration National Film Award
Directors who won the Best Film on National Integration National Film Award
Odia film screenwriters